Ron Taylor is an Australian former rugby league footballer in the New South Wales Rugby League (NSWRL) who played for both the Eastern Suburbs and South Sydney clubs as well as being a representative of his state -  NSW -  in that sport.

A centre, Taylor began his rugby league career with Eastern Suburbs in 1953 where he played 16 matches before injuries forced his early retirement at the end of the 1954 season.

Taylor came out of retirement in 1957, playing 40 matches for the South Sydney clubs in the years (1957–61).

In the 1958 season the centre was selected to represent NSW.

References

Australian rugby league players
Sydney Roosters players
South Sydney Rabbitohs players
New South Wales rugby league team players
City New South Wales rugby league team players
Year of birth missing (living people)
Living people
Place of birth missing (living people)